A macroglobulin is a plasma globulin of high molecular weight.

Elevated levels of macroglobulins (macroglobulinemia) may cause manifestations of excess blood viscosity (as is the case for IgM antibodies in Waldenström macroglobulinemia) and/or precipitate within blood vessels when temperature drops (as in cryoglobulinaemia).

Other macroglobulins include α2-macroglobulin, which is elevated in nephrotic syndrome, diabetes, severe burns, and other conditions, while a deficiency is associated with chronic obstructive pulmonary disease.

References

External links
 

Blood proteins